The mountain yellow warbler or mountain flycatcher-warbler (Iduna similis) is a species of Acrocephalidae warbler; formerly, these were placed in the paraphyletic "Old World warblers".

Range and habitat
It is found in Burundi, DRC, Kenya, Malawi, Rwanda, South Sudan, Tanzania, Uganda, and Zambia.
Its natural habitats are subtropical or tropical moist montane forests and subtropical or tropical moist shrubland.

References

 BirdLife International 2004.  Chloropeta similis.   2006 IUCN Red List of Threatened Species.   Downloaded on 10 July 2007.
Fregin, S., M. Haase, U. Olsson, and P. Alström. 2009. Multi-locus phylogeny of the family Acrocephalidae (Aves: Passeriformes) - the traditional taxonomy overthrown. Molecular Phylogenetics and Evolution 52: 866–878.

mountain yellow warbler
Birds of Sub-Saharan Africa
Birds of East Africa
mountain yellow warbler
mountain yellow warbler
Taxonomy articles created by Polbot